Uruch Beg Bayad (also spelled Oruch or Oruj), later known by his baptized name of Don Juan (1560–1604) was a late 16th and early 17th century Iranian figure in Iran and Spain. He is also known as Faisal Nazary. A native of Iran, and from the Bayat Qizilbash clan,. In 1599 Shah Abbas I sent an envoy to Europe headed by the English traveler Anthony Shirley and Hossein Ali Beg Bayat. Uruch Beg Bayat as a cousin of the latter was part of the delegation. The envoy was equipped with letters to rulers of the Kingdoms of Spain, England, Scotland, the Polish–Lithuanian Commonwealth, Tsardom of Muscovy and the Republic of Venice. In Astrakhan, the envoy merged with the Shah's previously sent delegation to Tsar Boris Godunov, led by Pir-qoli Beg. At the tsar's insistence, the delegation bypassed Poland–Lithuania and via the port of Arkhangelsk, sailing around Scandinavia, reached the port of Emden and from there Prague in October 1600. In 1601, the envoy reached Rome, and later that year reached Spain, where it was welcomed by King Philip III in Valladolid. As a result of internal disputes, some of the messengers remained in Spain and received baptism, among them Uruch Beg Bayat. Hossein Ali Beg Bayat continued his route to Iran through Lisbon and Goa in 1602.

In Spain Uruch Beg Bayat, under the new name of Don Juan de Persia wrote an account of Iran, his involvement there with Shah Abbas I, and his journey to Spain in the Persian embassy to Europe (1599–1602). He was killed in 1604 during a street fight.

Don Juan was the son of Sultan Ali Beg, who was the brother of the Iranian ambassador Hossein Ali Beg Bayat.

References

Sources
Don Juan of Persia: A Shi'ah Catholic 1560-1604 translated by G. Le Strange (New York & London, 1926). [full text]
Don Juan of Persia: A Shi'ah Catholic translated by G. Le Strange  (reprint Kessinger, 2003). [excerpt]
W. E. D. Alden "Notes on Don Juan of Persia's account of Georgia", 1930, School of Oriental and African studies

1560 births
1604 deaths
16th-century Iranian writers
17th-century Iranian writers
Converts to Roman Catholicism from Shia Islam
Iranian emigrants to Spain
Iranian former Shia Muslims
Iranian Roman Catholics
16th-century people of Safavid Iran
Spanish former Muslims
Spanish Roman Catholics
16th-century travel writers
17th-century travel writers
Iranian travel writers
17th-century people of Safavid Iran
Safavid diplomats